Douglas Mast (7 April 1944 – 24 April 2002) was a sports shooter from the United States Virgin Islands. He competed in the 50 metre rifle, prone event at the 1972 Summer Olympics.

References

1944 births
2002 deaths
United States Virgin Islands male sport shooters
Olympic shooters of the United States Virgin Islands
Shooters at the 1972 Summer Olympics
Sportspeople from New York City